Ready for Battle is the debut studio album by American hip hop group the Rock Steady Crew. It was released in 1984 via Virgin Records. Production was handled by Budd "Blue Soldier" Dixon and Stephen Hague. The album peaked at #19 on the VG-lista Topp 40 Album chart and at #45 on the Sverigetopplistan Veckolista Album chart. It spawned three singles: "(Hey You) The Rock Steady Crew", "Uprock" and "She's Fresh".

Track listing

Charts

References

External links 

1984 debut albums
Virgin Records albums
Rock Steady Crew albums
Albums produced by Stephen Hague